Sovereign and Popular Italy (ISP) was a populist, sovereignist and Eurosceptic political alliance in Italy, formed in July 2022 in order to participate in the 2022 Italian general election. After the election, ISP was disbanded and some of its components gave birth to "Sovereign and Popular Democracy". Its leaders were Francesco Toscano and Marco Rizzo.

History
In early 2022, several minor parties and groups including Marco Rizzo's Communist Party (PC), Antonio Ingroia's Civil Action (AC), Stefano D'Andrea's Reconquer Italy (RI), Francesco Toscano's Italy Again (AI) and Adriano Duina's United Italy (IU) agreed on joining their forces in opposition to the policies of Mario Draghi's government of national unity. ISP founding members especially contested Draghi's policies on mandatory COVID-19 vaccination in Italy. Moreover, they harshly condemned the government's response to the 2022 Russian invasion of Ukraine. The coalition was also supportive of Italy's exit from NATO and the European Union.

On 5 July 2022, the parties announced a cooperation for the next general election; on 25 July, following Draghi's resignation as prime minister following the 2022 Italian government crisis, the parties launched on social media their joint list for the upcoming 2022 Italian general election in September, named Sovereign and Popular Italy (ISP). On 1 August, the member parties officially launched ISP during a press conference in the Italian Senate; Rizzo described the alliance as "the only alternative against the liberist, warmonger and sanitary totalitarianism".

On the following day, MEP Francesca Donato (leader of Republican Rebirth) announced that she will not run for the next elections, stating that the anti-establishment front was "fragmented and disorganized". The list was later joined by Socialist Homeland (PS), a left-wing nationalist movement.

In November 2022 Toscano left AI and launched "Sovereign and Popular Italy Again" (AISP). In December D'Andrea announced that ISP was dissolved, by mutual agreement of the other two leading members, Rizzo and Toscano. In January 2023 the PC (whose leader Rizzo had stepped down from secretary and had become the party's honorary president), AC, AISP and the Front for Popular Sovereignty (a breakway group of RI) launched "Sovereign and Popular Democracy".

Composition

Electoral results

Italian Parliament

References

2022 establishments in Italy
2022 disestablishments in Italy
Political parties established in 2022
Political parties disestablished in 2022
Left-wing politics in Italy
Right-wing politics in Italy
Political party alliances in Italy
Syncretic political movements